Kesteren is a railway station located in Kesteren, Netherlands. The station opened on 1 November 1882 and is on the Elst–Dordrecht railway. Train services are operated by Arriva. Between 1945 and 1981, this station was called Kesteren- Rhenen.

The station was the terminus of the line from Amersfoort, which allowed a faster journey time to Nijmegen from Amsterdam. The line still exists between Amersfoort and Leusden, Near Overberg to Rhenen and Kesteren station itself. The section between Amersfoort and Leusden is still in use and is known as the Ponlijn and the section between Rhenen and Kesteren is still in uses as the Veenendaallijn.

Train services

Bus services

References

External links
NS website 
Dutch Public Transport journey planner 

Railway stations in Gelderland
Railway stations opened in 1882
Neder-Betuwe
1882 establishments in the Netherlands
Railway stations in the Netherlands opened in the 19th century